René Schneebauer (born 14 June 1998) is an Austrian football player. He plays for SPG Silz/Mötz.

Club career
He made his Austrian Football First League debut for WSG Wattens on 14 October 2016 in a game against SC Wiener Neustadt.

Personal life
His twin brother Niko Schneebauer is also a football player.

References

External links
 
 René Schneebauer at ÖFB

1998 births
Living people
Austrian twins
Twin sportspeople
Austrian footballers
WSG Tirol players
2. Liga (Austria) players
Austrian Regionalliga players
Association football midfielders